Phumza Maweni (born September 4, 1984) is a South African netball player in the Netball Superleague in the UK, representing Team Bath Netball.

Maweni was raised in Cala, in the Eastern Cape of South Africa. She went on to compete for the Kingdom Stars and Southern Stings in the South African Brutal Fruit Netball Cup and has also played several seasons in England's Netball Superleague, first for the Loughborough Lightning and later for the Severn Stars. Maweni's exceptional form in the local South African league led to national team coach Norma Plummer calling on her to be signed by foreign clubs in higher profile leagues. She has featured for the South Africa national netball team on several occasions, most notably in the 2018 Commonwealth Games.

She was signed by the Sunshine Coast Lightning in Australia ahead of the 2019 season and spent three seasons with the Suncorp Super Netball club, playing all 47 matches. She then signed for Team Bath Netball in England in December 2021 and will play for them during the 2022 Superleague season.

References

External links
 Sunshine Coast Lightning profile
 Suncorp Super Netball profile
 Netball Draft Central profile

1984 births
South African netball players
Netball Superleague players
Netball players at the 2018 Commonwealth Games
Sunshine Coast Lightning players
Living people
2019 Netball World Cup players
South African expatriate netball people in Australia
South African expatriate netball people in England
Loughborough Lightning netball players
Severn Stars players
Suncorp Super Netball players
Commonwealth Games competitors for South Africa